The 2009 Texas Tech Red Raiders football team represented Texas Tech University as a member of the Big 12 Conference during the 2009 NCAA Division I FBS football season. The team was led by tenth-year head coach Mike Leach during the regular season and, following Leach’s dismissal, interim head coach Ruffin McNeill for the bowl game. The Red Raiders compiled an overall record of 9–4 with a mrk of 5–3 in conference play, tying for third place in the Big 12's South Division. Texas Tech was invited to the Alamo Bowl, where they defeated Michigan State, 41–31. The Red Raiders played home games at Jones AT&T Stadium in Lubbock, Texas.

On December 28, Leach was suspended by Texas Tech pending investigation of alleged inappropriate treatment of Adam James, a redshirt sophomore wide receiver, and the son of former SMU Mustangs and New England Patriots running back Craig James. The suspension came after allegations that Leach treated James unfairly following a mild concussion. Leach was terminated by the university on December 30. Ruffin McNeill, the team's defensive coordinator, was named interim head coach and led the team during their appearance in the Alamo Bowl.

Previous season

With an 11–1 record in the regular season during 2008, the Red Raiders finished in a three-way tie with the Oklahoma Sooners and Texas Longhorns atop the Big 12 South. In order to break the tie, BCS standings were used to determine who would face Missouri in the conference championship game. The Sooners, ranked #2 in the BCS polls at the time, were chosen to represent the South Division in the game. The Red Raiders were selected to the Cotton Bowl Classic, losing 34–47 to Ole Miss. The 2008 team finished with an overall record of 11–2 and were ranked no. 12 in the final AP Poll.

Personnel

Coaching staff
Mike Leach – Head Coach/Offensive Coordinator
Ruffin McNeill – Assistant Head Coach/Defensive Coordinator
Carlos Mainord – Safeties
Clay McGuire – Running Backs
Brian Mitchell – Cornerbacks
Matt Moore – Offensive Line
Lincoln Riley – Inside Receivers
Eric Russell – Special Teams Coordinator
Charlie Sadler – Defensive Ends
Dennis Simmons – Wide Receivers
Sonny Cumbie – Offensive Graduate Assistant

Source:

Roster

Schedule

Game summaries

North Dakota

This game marked the first time the North Dakota Fight Sioux faced the Red Raiders on the football field making North Dakota the 127th different opponent the Red Raiders have faced. The Red Raiders won the coin toss and elected to receive the opening kick off.

The opening drive ultimately ended in a touchdown and covered 64 yards in 7 plays, lasting 3:18. Barron Batch rushed three yards for the first touchdown and was followed by a successful extra point attempt by Matt Williams. The Red Raiders would go on to score one more touchdown with successful PAT in the first quarter. The Fighting Sioux scored a field goal with six seconds left in the first quarter bringing the final score for the first quarter to 14–3.

The second quarter saw the longest touchdown reception of the game with a 49-yard pass by Taylor Potts to Detron Lewis, followed by a successful PAT by Matt Williams. The Fighting Sioux went on to kick a 52-yard field goal with 1:28 left in the half. The final score at the half was 21–6.

The third quarter saw only one score with the Red Raider's quarterback Taylor Potts rushing 1 yard for a touchdown followed by a successful PAT. At the end of the third quarter the score was 28–6.

The Fighting Sioux scored their only touchdown and successful PAT 3:09 into the final quarter. The Red Raiders scored twice in the fourth quarter with a 32-yard field goal by Matt Williams and later an 18-yard touchdown pass by Taylor Potts to Adam Jones. Matt Williams successfully kicked the last PAT of the game bringing the score to 38–13.

During the game, the Red Raiders rushed for 40 yards. Taylor Potts attempted 48 passes, completing 34 for a total of 405 passing yards. Potts was also intercepted 3 times and scored 2 touchdowns. The team accrued 11 penalties for 93 yards.

Rice

This game was the first time the Rice Owls played Texas Tech Red Raiders at home since 1995. The Owls won the coin toss and elected to defer until the second half.

The Red Raiders shut the Owls out in the first quarter and scored two touchdowns. The first score came 6:13 into the game by way of a 5-yard touchdown pass from Taylor Potts to Edward Britton. Matt Williams successfully kicked the PAT. The next touchdown for the Red Raiders would come with only 1:18 left in the first quarter, when Taylor Potts threw a 7-yard pass to Lyle Leong. The extra point attempt was good. At the end of the quarter the score was 14–0.

The second quarter saw no scores by the Red Raiders. The Owls scored a field goal 3:33 into the quarter. The score at the half was 14–3.

The third quarter proved to be more fruitful for the Red Raiders, were they once again shut out the Owls. The Red Raiders scored three touchdowns with successful PATs all within the last nine minutes of the quarter. The first came with 8:51 left in quarter when Taylor Potts threw an 8-yard pass to Lyle Leong. The next touchdown came a little over two minutes later with an 11-yard touchdown reception by Austin Zouzalik from Taylor Potts. The last touchdown was scored with 2:34 left in the quarter by Taylor Potts and Lyle Leon when Potts threw a 27-yard pass to Leon. At the end of the quarter the score was 35–3.

Steven Sheffield, the Red Raiders backup quarterback, made his season debut when he came in for Taylor Potts during the final quarter after two touchdowns by the Red Raiders and a field goal by the Owls. The first Red Raider touchdown came only nine seconds into the quarter with a 34-yard touchdown reception by Eric Stephens from Taylor Potts. Matt Williams failed to convert the extra point kick. The Owls scored their only touchdown with 11:02 left on the clock. Taylor Potts last touchdown of the game came by way of a 30-yard pass to Tramain Swindall with 9:10 left in the game. The extra point attempt was good. The Red Raiders final score, and Steven Sheffield's first for the season came with 4:33 left in the game when Sheffield threw a 26-yard pass to Tramain Swindall. The PAT was converted by Matt Williams. The final score for the game was 55–10.

The Texas Tech Red Raiders rushed for 52 yards and passed for 508 yards. Taylor Potts attempted 57 passes, completing 36 for 456 yards. Steven Sheffield completed 4 out of 6 passes for 52 yards. Potts threw seven touchdown passes to Sheffield's one. Neither Potts nor Sheffield threw an interception.

The Owls rushed for 60 yards, passed for 197 yards, and scored 1 touchdown.

at Texas

The Texas Tech Red Raiders competed against the Texas Longhorns at Darrell K Royal-Texas Memorial Stadium on September 9, 2009. For the second year in a row the matchup was highlighted on ESPN's GameDay.

The series between Texas Tech and Texas originated in Austin in 1928 and the two teams have met annually since 1960. Before the game, Texas led the series 43–15–0. The Red Raider's victory in the 2008 season was only the second time in the last 10 meetings.

The Texas Tech Red Raiders received the opening kick off and returned it 28 yards. The Red Raiders opening driving ended with a 41-yard field goal by Matt Williams. On their second drive the Longhorns scored by returning a Red Raider punt 46 yards for a touchdown. The score at the end of the first quarter was 3–7.

The Red Raiders did not score in the second quarter, and would hold the Longhorns to only a field goal. At the half the score was 3–10.

The third quarter saw two touchdowns by both the Red Raiders and the Longhorns. The Longhorns scored a touchdown and successful PAT, on their opening drive of the second half. On the next possession the Red Raiders answered the Longhorns score with a touchdown and successful PAT of their own. The Red Raiders first touchdown of the game came by way of a 14-yard pass to Lyle Leong by Taylor Potts and the PAT was kicked by Matt Williams. After an unsuccessful on-side kick by the Red Raiders, Texas's next drive would end with a touchdown and PAT. The Red Raiders next drive proved as fruitful as their previous ending with a 10-yard touchdown pass by Potts to Leong. The final score at the end of the quarter was 17–24.

The Red Raider's first two possessions of the fourth quarters ended in a turnovers. The second of which resulted in a Longhorn touchdown, their last of the game. The Red Raiders last score came on their next possession by way of a 22-yard touchdown reception by Tramain Swindall from Taylor Potts. The Longhorns would score the final points of the game with a field goal. The final score of the game was 24–34.

The Longhorns rushed for 135 yards and the Longhorns' Colt McCoy attempted 34 passes completing 24 for 205 yards and was intercepted twice. The Red Raiders rushed for -6 yards and fumbled the ball once. Taylor Potts completed 46 passes out of an attempted 62 for a total of 420 yards. Potts was intercepted once.

at Houston

The Texas Tech Red Raiders faced the Houston Cougars at Robertson Stadium in Houston Texas on September 26. This non-conference game was the 28th time the two teams meet, however this was the first time the Red Raiders have played at Robertson Stadium. The Red Raiders ultimately lost the game with a final score of 28–29, dropping their record to 2–2.

New Mexico

The Red Raiders competed against the New Mexico Lobos at Jones AT&T Stadium in Lubbock, Texas, on October 3, 2009. Going into the game, the Red Raiders led the series with a record of 32–6–2. This was the first meeting of the two teams since 2004. The Red Raiders beat the Lobos with a final score of 48–28. Taylor Potts led the Raiders to a score on their first possession of the game, but he left the game with an injury in the second quarter, and Steven Sheffield came in late in the second quarter. Sheffield's 25-yard touchdown pass to Alexander Torres gave the Raiders a 14-7 halftime lead.
Sheffield threw two third-quarter touchdown passes, including a 62-yard catch and run by Harrison Jeffers, as the Raiders extended their lead to 35-7. Jeffers added two more touchdown runs in the fourth quarter to finish the scoring in Tech's 48-28 win.

Kansas State

The Red Raiders took on the Kansas State Wildcats at Jones AT&T Stadium in Lubbock, Texas, on October 10, 2009. This homecoming game was the 11th meeting of the two teams. The Red Raiders had won the previous four games against the Wildcats and had a record of 5–1 at home against the team prior to this game. The game was regionally televised on FSN. The Red Raiders beat the Wildcats with a final score of 66–14. Tech's 66 points were the most ever scored on a team coached by Bill Snyder.

at Nebraska

The Red Raiders took on the No. 15 Nebraska Cornhuskers at the Memorial Stadium in Lincoln, Nebraska on October 17, 2009. Before a crowd of more than 86,000, the Raiders jumped out in front early on a touchdown pass from Sheffield to Baron Batch.

Tech's defense then made the biggest play of the game, with defensive end Daniel Howard picking up a fumbled lateral pass and returning it 82 yards for a touchdown and a 14-0 Red Raider lead. The Raiders were up 24-3 as the defense kept Nebraska's offense in check.

The Red Raider offense was stalled in the second half, but Tech's defense continued to make big plays to keep the Huskers from making a comeback. Defensive end Brandon Sharpe had four of Tech's five sacks, and Sheffield scored on a quarterback sneak to put Tech up by three touchdowns late in the game.
With the win, the Raiders improved to 5-2 and appeared in the AP top 25 for the first and only time during the 2009 regular season at No. 21 in the nation.

Texas A&M

The Red Raiders competed against the Texas A&M Aggies at the Jones AT&T Stadium in Lubbock, Texas on October 24, 2009. Tech scored first on a 56-yard touchdown pass from Taylor Potts to Alexander Torres, and Potts hooked up with Edward Britton for another touchdown to give Tech a 14-7 lead late in the first quarter.  The Aggies then went on to score 31 straight points in the second and third quarters to pull away.

Attendance for the game was 57,733. It was the largest crowd at football game at Jones AT&T Stadium, beating the previous record of 56,333, set on November 1, 2008 in the game against Texas.

Kansas

The Red Raiders faced the Kansas Jayhawks at the Jones AT&T Stadium in Lubbock, Texas on October 31, 2009. Redshirt freshman quarterback Seth Doege got his first NCAA start because of injuries to Taylor Potts and Steven Sheffield. The Raiders didn't get on the scoreboard until the second quarter, when Doege hit Detron Lewis on a 61-yard touchdown bomb to tie the game at 7-7. Later in the second quarter, Colby Whitlock sacked Todd Reesing and forced a fumble deep in Kansas territory, which the Raiders recovered. Baron Batch scored on a 2-yard run, and the two teams went into halftime tied 14-14.

The Jayhawks took a 21-14 lead into the fourth quarter, but the Raiders put up four touchdowns to pull away. Batch scored three touchdowns on the ground, and Laron Moore added a score on a fumble recovery.

at Oklahoma State

Oklahoma

Tech came into the home game against Oklahoma seeking revenge for the 65-21 rout that the Raiders suffered in the 2008 match-up against the Sooners. The game saw a low-scoring first quarter, with Tech going up 3-0 on their first possession. Taylor Potts put Tech in position to score with passes to Lyle Leong, Edward Britton and Baron Batch to set up Matt Williams' 33-yard field goal.
The game was tied 3-3 after the first quarter, but the Raiders' offense got on track with two second-quarter touchdowns. Batch scored on a 1-yard touchdown run, set up by a 65-yard pass from Potts to Torres. Tech's defense forced a quick OU punt, and Potts then hooked up with Zouzalik on a 21-yard touchdown pass to give the Raiders a 17-6 halftime lead.
Tech's defense shut down the Sooners on Oklahoma's opening possession of the second half, and the Raiders quickly marched 91 yards for another touchdown, with Potts hitting Torres on a 24-yard scoring pass for a 24-6 lead.
Tech cornerback Laron Moore intercepted an Oklahoma pass on the Sooners' next possession, but the Raiders could not push the ball in for a touchdown, settling for a 37-yard field goal from Williams.
On Tech's next possession, the Raiders mounted an 18-play drive that chewed up more than seven minutes before scoring on a 21-yard run by Batch. Oklahoma finally scored their only touchdown on a pass from Landry Jones to Ryan Broyles, but the Raiders added a final touchdown on a 4-yard run by Eric Stephens.

vs. Baylor

vs. Michigan State (Valero Alamo Bowl)

Rankings

References

Texas Tech
Texas Tech Red Raiders football seasons
Alamo Bowl champion seasons
Texas Tech Red Raiders football